Test of English Proficiency may refer to:

 International Test of English Proficiency
 TEPS, or Test of English Proficiency developed by Seoul National University

See also
Oxford Test of English